Joe Dolan (1939–2007) was an Irish entertainer, recorder and singer of easy listening songs.

Joe Dolan may also refer to:
"Galway Joe" Dolan (1942–2008), Irish musician, songwriter and artist
Joe Dolan (footballer) (born 1980), English footballer
Joe Dolan (baseball) (1873–1938), American professional baseball player